Găgeni may refer to several villages in Romania:

 Găgeni, a village in Săhăteni Commune, Buzău County
 Găgeni, a village in Păuleşti Commune, Prahova County
 Găgeni, a village in Lădești Commune, Vâlcea County